Boon Lay is a planning area located in the West Region of Singapore. The planning area is bounded by the planning areas of Pioneer to the west, Jurong West to the north, Jurong East to the east and the strait of Selat Jurong to the south.

The Boon Lay Planning Area is different from Boon Lay. The latter is a residential neighbourhood located in the adjacent Jurong West Planning Area. Along with adjacent Pioneer, the Boon Lay Planning Area is a constituent part of the much larger Jurong Industrial Estate.

Geography

Location
The Boon Lay Planning Area is located along the southwestern coast of the Singapore mainland and to the north of Jurong Island.

Included as part of the territory of Boon Lay Planning Area is Pulau Samulun, a minor island off Singapore's southwestern coast and connected to the mainland via Jalan Samulun.

Subzones
As defined by the Urban Redevelopment Authority, Boon Lay Planning Area is officially divided into 4 subzones:

West Region, Singapore